= Dingit.tv =

DingIt
- Website type: Video hosting service
- Website: www.dingit.tv
- Commercial: Yes
- Current status: Active

Dingit.tv.
- Founded: 2014
- Website: www.dingit.tv

DingIt is a video games and eSports video-hosting website headquartered in London, England.

== History ==
Founded in 2014 by Mark Hain, DingIt put on a variety of original live e-Sports events and launched at the end of February 2015 with 7,000 viewers and grew to over 170,000 viewers by the end of April 2015. The company has received two rounds of funding to date, the first consisting of $1.5M follow-on seed funding.

In 2016, DingIt changed their content to focus on short-form highlights, instead of long format tournament videos.

At the start of 2017, DingIt's parent company was renamed to Level Up Media in order to grow a portfolio of owned and operated sites and syndication partner network within gaming. DingIt continues as the flagship site in the Level Up Media network.
